The 1886 Quebec general election on October 14, 1886, to elect members of the 6th Legislative Assembly for the Province of Quebec, Canada.  The Parti National, a broad coalition formed and led by Honoré Mercier, that included the Parti libéral du Québec and nationalist defectors from the Conservative party. The Parti national got a large boost when Liberals and dissident Conservatives rallied in reaction to the hanging of Louis Riel in 1885, for which the federal Conservatives were held responsible by Quebec voters. The nationalists won a majority of seats against the Parti conservateur du Québec, led by John Jones Ross.

The Conservatives hung on in a minority government until Mercier became premier on January 27, 1887.

Results

Footnotes

See also
 List of Quebec premiers
 Politics of Quebec
 Timeline of Quebec history
 List of Quebec political parties
 6th Legislative Assembly of Quebec

Quebec general election
Elections in Quebec
General election
Quebec general election